State of Shock is a Canadian band from Vancouver, British Columbia. Formed by Jesse Wainwright and Johnny Philippon, they made their debut in June 2004 with their album Guilty by Association after winning CFOX-FM's Seeds contest, and won Favourite New Group of the Year at the 2005 Canadian Music Awards.

They became better known in early 2007, with the release of their album Life, Love & Lies. Included in the album was their successful debut single, "Money Honey", which won the band a Juno Award nomination for New Group of the Year, two Canadian Radio Music Awards in the category of Best New Group for both rock and CHR formats, as well as a Canadian Indie Music Award for Favourite Single of the Year. The single eventually reached the double platinum sales mark for digital sales in Canada and stayed on Billboard's Canadian Hot 100 chart for nearly a year. With their second single "Hearts that Bleed", the band enjoyed a top-ten slot at MuchMusic and rock radio. During the summer of 2007, State of Shock went on a Canada-wide tour supporting bands such as Nickelback and Puddle of Mudd, and opening for Aerosmith in front of 27,000 people at Sarnia Bayfest.

State of Shock released their third and most recent studio album, Rock N' Roll Romance, on 20 September 2011. Both albums were produced by Jeff Dawson and mixed by Mike Fraser.

In 2014, Jesse Wainwright (guitar, backing vocals) teamed up with country singer Stacey McKitrick as a new country duo, Austin Belle, with Kadooh (Simon Clow) playing guitar for Austin Belle's live shows.

Band members
Cameron Melnyk: lead vocals
Alison Toews: bass, backing vocals
Jesse Wainwright: guitar, backing vocals
Simon Clow (Kadooh): guitar, backing vocals
Johnny Philippon: drums

Discography

Albums

Singles

1 Weren't produced into physical singles, but music videos were made for them.

Awards

Canadian Radio Music Awards
Best Rock song (for "Money Honey") – Winner
Best Contemporary hit radio song (for "Money Honey") – Winner
Best Hot Adult Contemporary song (for "Money Honey") –
Independent Single of the Year (money honey) – Winner – (beat out Feist)
Western Canadian Rock Recording of the Year 2008 – Winner

2008 Juno Awards
Best New Group of the Year – Nominated

Independent Music Awards 
Hard Rock/Metal Album of the year (Life, Love, and Lies) – Nominated

Television appearances
In 2008, State of Shock appeared on the show About a Girl, playing their single "Money Honey".

References

External links

Musical groups established in 1999
Canadian alternative rock groups
Canadian pop rock music groups
Musical groups from Vancouver
1999 establishments in British Columbia